Designated as an American National Standard, the Uniform Solar, Hydronics and Geothermal Code (USHGC) is a model code developed by the International Association of Plumbing and Mechanical Officials (IAPMO) to govern the installation and inspection of solar energy, hydronic heating/cooling systems, and geothermal energy systems as a means of promoting the public's health, safety and welfare.

The USHGC is developed using the American National Standards Institute's consensus development procedures. This process brings together volunteers representing a variety of viewpoints and interests to achieve consensus on solar energy, hydronic heating/cooling systems, and geothermal energy practices.

History
Recognizing the necessity for a solar energy code to be adopted by jurisdictions as a means of regulating such systems, IAPMO passed a resolution at its 1975 annual business conference to form a technical committee for the development of such a document.

After several months of work, this committee, composed of individuals representing industry, public utility companies, inspectors, plumbers, and engineers, completed the Uniform Solar Energy Code's (USEC) first edition and in September 1976 this document was adopted by IAPMO.

In December 2011, the Radiant Professionals Alliance joined IAPMO and soon after work began to incorporate hydronic heating/cooling provisions into the USEC to be released in 2015 as the Uniform Solar Energy and Hydronics Code (USEHC).

2018 Edition
Though geothermal energy is not new in the 2018 edition, the title for the 2018 edition was revised to clarify that the code also pertains to geothermal energy systems. The 2018 Uniform Solar, Hydronics and Geothermal Code (USHGC) represents the most current approaches in the solar energy, hydronics and geothermal field.

Content
 Chapter 1 - Administration
 Chapter 2 - Definitions
 Chapter 3 - General Regulations
 Chapter 4 - Hydronics
 Chapter 5 - Solar Thermal Systems
 Chapter 6 - Thermal Storage
 Chapter 7 - Geothermal Energy Systems
 Chapter 8 - Duct Systems
 Chapter 9 - Solar Photovoltaic Systems
 Chapter 10 - Referenced Standards
 Appendix A - Engineered Solar Energy Systems
 Appendix B - Solar Photovoltaic System Installation Guidelines
 Appendix C - Supplemental Checklist for Solar Photovoltaic Systems

See also
 IAPMO
 IAPMO Standards
 IAPMO R&T
 Thermal energy storage
 Uniform Codes
 Uniform Plumbing Code
 Uniform Mechanical Code
 Uniform Swimming Pool, Spa and Hot Tub Code
 Building officials
 Building inspection

External links
 Uniform Solar, Hydronics & Geothermal Code Website

References
 1975 Uniform Solar Energy Code Resolution
 1976 Uniform Solar Energy Code Advertisement
 1976 IAPMO Conference Wrap
 1976 San Gabriel Valley Tribune Reprint
 First USEC Technical Committee
 RPA Membership Ratifies Move to IAPMO
 IAPMO Seeking Technical Committee Members

Safety codes
Plumbing